

114001–114100 

|-id=022
| 114022 Bizyaev ||  || Dmitry Bizyaev (born 1969), a Russian-American astronomer with the Sloan Digital Sky Survey || 
|-id=023
| 114023 Harvanek ||  || Michael J. Harvanek (born 1963), American astronomer with  the Sloan Digital Sky Survey || 
|-id=024
| 114024 Scotkleinman ||  || Scot J. Kleinman (born 1965), American astronomer with  the Sloan Digital Sky Survey || 
|-id=025
| 114025 Krzesinski ||  || Jurek Krzesiński (born 1962), American astronomer with the Sloan Digital Sky Survey || 
|-id=026
| 114026 Emalanushenko ||  || Elena Malanushenko (born 1956), Ukrainian-American astronomer with the Sloan Digital Sky Survey || 
|-id=027
| 114027 Malanushenko ||  || Viktor Malanushenko (born 1955), Ukrainian-American astronomer with the Sloan Digital Sky Survey || 
|-id=094
| 114094 Irvpatterson ||  || W. Irwin Patterson (born 1930), American biology professor emeritus at Texas Lutheran University || 
|-id=096
| 114096 Haroldbier ||  || Harold D. Bier (born 1931), chemistry professor emeritus at Texas Lutheran University || 
|}

114101–114200 

|-id=156
| 114156 Eamonlittle ||  || Eamon Little (1966–2006) was an Irish astronomer at Queen's University, Belfast, and a friend and colleague of astronomers Alan Fitzsimmons and Iwan P. Williams who discovered this minor planet || 
|}

114201–114300 

|-id=239
| 114239 Bermarmi || 2002 WN || Bernard Young (1911–1988), Mary Young (1912–1996), and Michael Young (born 1937), parents and brother of American discoverer James Whitney Young || 
|}

114301–114400 

|-bgcolor=#f2f2f2
| colspan=4 align=center | 
|}

114401–114500 

|-bgcolor=#f2f2f2
| colspan=4 align=center | 
|}

114501–114600 

|-bgcolor=#f2f2f2
| colspan=4 align=center | 
|}

114601–114700 

| 114608 Emanuelepace ||  || Emanuele Pace (born 1964), an Italian professor of astronomy and astrophysics at the University of Florence and the director of its Chianti Observatory. He is also a project manager with ESA's ARIEL space telescope that will study explanetary atmospheres. The asteroid's name was suggested by CINEOS astronomer Mario Di Martino. || 
|-id=611
| 114611 Valeriobocci ||  || Valerio Bocci (born 1966), is an Italian Physicist, senior technologist at INFN Roma. He has been involved in the DELPHI at LEP (CERN), KLOE experiment of DAFNE Frascati National Laboratory, in the ATLAS and LHCb experiments at LHC CERN. He was one of the first in the scientific literature to propose and demonstrate the possibility to use Field Programmable Gate Array in radiation environment.|| 
|-id=612
| 114612 Sandrasavaglio ||  || Sandra Savaglio (born 1967) is a physicist and a leading researchers on γ-ray bursts. She has taught at Johns Hopkins University in Baltimore, and at the Max Plank Institute in Germany. Savaglio is currently teaching astronomy at the University of Calabria. || 
|-id=613
| 114613 Antoninobrosio ||  || Antonino Brosio (born 1987) is a structural engineer, and the founder and director of the first public observatory and astronomical park in Calabria. He has carried out several national and international collaborations involving the Calabrian schools, and is the discoverer of some variable stars and extragalactic supernovae. || 
|-id=649
| 114649 Jeanneacker ||  || Jeanne Christophe (née Acker), the mother of French astronomer Bernard Christophe, who discovered this minor planet || 
|-id=659
| 114659 Sajnovics ||  || János Sajnovics (1733–1785), Hungarian linguist and Jesuit || 
|-id=689
| 114689 Tomstevens ||  || Tom Stevens (born 1933) and his wife Dixie (born 1938), American benefactors and advisors of the George Observatory in Needville, Texas. || 
|}

114701–114800 

|-id=703
| 114703 North Dakota ||  || North Dakota, the 39th U.S. state || 
|-id=705
| 114705 Tamayo ||  || Arnaldo Tamayo Méndez (born 1942) was the first person of African ancestry and the first Latin American to travel into space as a Cuban cosmonaut on the crew of Soyuz 38 in September 1980. He received the first Hero of the Republic of Cuba medal and many other honors. || 
|-id=725
| 114725 Gordonwalker ||  || Gordon A. H. Walker (born 1936), professor emeritus at the University of British Columbia || 
|-id=735
| 114735 Irenemagni ||  || Irene Magni (born 1976), a business consultant and fiancée of Italian astronomer Fabrizio Bernardi who discovered this minor planet. || 
|}

114801–114900 

|-id=828
| 114828 Ricoromita ||  || Enrico Romita (born 1963), Italian software developer on Solar System dynamics, specialized on structural automatic computation || 
|-id=829
| 114829 Chierchia ||  || Luigi Chierchia (born 1957), Italian professor of mathematical analysis, and recipient of the 1995 prize of the Institut Henri Poincaré || 
|}

114901–115000 

|-id=987
| 114987 Tittel ||  || Pál Tittel (1784–1831), Hungarian astronomer and professor || 
|-id=990
| 114990 Szeidl ||  || Béla Szeidl (born 1938), Hungarian astronomer, director of the Konkoly Observatory from 1974 to 1996. and president of IAU Commission 27 (Variable Stars, 1985–1988) || 
|-id=991
| 114991 Balázs ||  || Lajos G. Balázs (born 1941), Hungarian astronomer, director of the Konkoly Observatory since 1996) and co-discoverer of supernova 1969B || 
|}

References 

114001-115000